The 1971 LPGA Championship was the 17th LPGA Championship, held June 10–13 at Pleasant Valley Country Club in Sutton, Massachusetts, southeast of Worcester.

Kathy Whitworth, the 1967 champion, won the second of her three LPGA Championship titles, four strokes ahead of runner-up Kathy Ahern, who won the following year. It was the fifth of Whitworth's six major titles.

Past champions in the field

Made the cut

Source:

Missed the cut

Source:

Final leaderboard
Sunday, June 13, 1971

Source:

References

External links
Golf Observer leaderboard

LPGA Championship
LPGA Championship
LPGA Championship
Golf in Massachusetts
History of Worcester County, Massachusetts
LPGA Championship
Sports competitions in Massachusetts
Sports in Worcester County, Massachusetts
Sutton, Massachusetts
Tourist attractions in Worcester County, Massachusetts
Women's PGA Championship
Women's sports in Massachusetts